Virgilio Fiorenzi or Virgilio Fiorentini (1560–1644) was a Roman Catholic prelate who served as Bishop of Nocera Umbra (1605–1644).

Biography
Virgilio Fiorenzi was born in Perugia, Italy in 1560.
On 27 Jun 1605, he was appointed during the papacy of Pope Paul V as Bishop of Nocera Umbra. 
On 3 Jul 1605, he was consecrated bishop by Innocenzo Del Bufalo-Cancellieri, Bishop of Camerino, with Napoleone Comitoli, Bishop of Perugia, and Flaminio Filonardi, Bishop of Aquino, serving as co-consecrators. 
He served as Bishop of Nocera Umbra until his death on 9 Dec 1644.

Episcopal succession
While bishop, he was the principal co-consecrator of:
Domenico de' Marini, Bishop of Albenga (1611);
Angelo Gozzadini, Archbishop of Naxos (1616);
Giovanni Battista Colonna, Titular Patriarch of Jerusalem (1636).

References

External links and additional sources
 (for Chronology of Bishops)
 (for Chronology of Bishops)

17th-century Italian Roman Catholic bishops
Bishops appointed by Pope Paul V
1560 births
1644 deaths